Mesthüyük is a village in the Nurdağı District, Gaziantep Province, Turkey. The village is inhabited by Kurds of the Çelikan tribe and had a population of 167 in 2022.

References

Villages in Nurdağı District
Kurdish settlements in Gaziantep Province